International Clinical Psychopharmacology is a bimonthly peer-reviewed medical journal published by Wolters Kluwer Health. It covers neuropsychopharmacology and clinical psychiatry. It was established in 1986. The editor-in-chief is Alessandro Serretti (University of Bologna).

Abstracting and indexing
The journal is abstracted and indexed in:

According to the Journal Citation Reports, the journal has a 2021 impact factor of 2.023.

References

External links

Wolters Kluwer academic journals
Pharmacology journals
Psychiatry journals
Bimonthly journals
English-language journals
Publications established in 1986